St. John's Evangelical Lutheran Church is a historic church in Stovertown, Ohio.

History 
In 1819, a church was constructed on John George Swingle's land by William Foster, Traveling pastor. This church was utilized until 1831, when a new church was constructed half a mile south of Stovertown at its present location. A simple, neat frame chapel was constructed for $1,000 in 1851. The current church was constructed in 1878 and is still in use today.  It was added to the National Register in 1980

References

Lutheran churches in Ohio
Churches on the National Register of Historic Places in Ohio
Gothic Revival church buildings in Ohio
Churches completed in 1878
Churches in Muskingum County, Ohio
National Register of Historic Places in Muskingum County, Ohio